The International Welsh Poetry Competition is an annual English language poetry award and the largest of its kind in Wales. The contest was founded in 2007 by Welsh writer, poet and photographer Dave Lewis.

It was launched on St David's Day 2007 in Clwb-Y-Bont, Pontypridd.

The competition's judges, who include Welsh poets, have included John Evans, Mike Jenkins, Eloise Williams, Sally Spedding and Kathy Miles (former Bridport Prize winner).

The organiser, Dave Lewis, has also edited and published three anthologies of all the winners: The First Five Years, Ten Years On and The Third One. In 2020 he also founded the Poetry Book Awards, which seeks to reward poets with a book length collection.

Past winners
2022 Jennifer Hetherington (Fishermans Reach, Australia), Cross Words
2021 Estelle Price (Wilmslow, England), iii
2020 Sheila Aldous (Devon, England), The Debt Due
2019 Damen O'Brien (Queensland, Australia), The Map-Makers Tale
2018 Judy Durrant (Victoria, Australia), Prayer To A Jacaranda
2017 Rae Howells (Swansea, Wales), Airlings
2016 Tarquin Landseer (London, England), Blackfish
2015 Mick Evans (Carmarthenshire, Wales), Map Makers
2014 Kathy Miles (Cardigan, Wales), The Pain Game
2013 Josie Turner (Kent, England), Rations
2012 Sally Spedding (Ammanford, Wales), She wears green
2011 David J Costello (Wirral, England), Horseshoe Bat
2010 Sally Spedding (Ammanford, Wales), Litzmannstadt 1941
2009 John Gallas (Leicestershire, England), The origami lesson
2008 Emily Hinshelwood (Ammanford, Wales), Visually Speaking
2007 Gavin Price (Cardiff, Wales), Concrete

References

External links
Official website
Founder & organiser's website

British poetry awards